Bahia Adair or Adair Bay is a bay at the northern end of the Gulf of California in the municipality of San Luis Río Colorado in the state of Sonora in Mexico. It is 40 kilometers from east to west and 15 kilometres from north to south. It contains basins with sizable deposits of salts. There are three different habitats: the wetlands, artesian wells, and the salt pans. Endangered animals live in the area, including one endemic species, the desert pupfish. Portions of the area have been zoned for natural resource extraction. Bahia Adair is part of the Alto Golfo de California Biosphere Reserve is a UNESCO Biosphere Reserve (1995).

It was named by British explorer Robert William Hale Hardy and noted in his Travels in the Interior of Mexico in 1825 – 1828 originally published in London in 1829.  Hardy thought it marked the entrance to the Colorado River.

References

Bays of Mexico on the Pacific Ocean
Ramsar sites in Mexico
Landforms of Sonora